Equilin is a naturally occurring estrogen sex hormone found in horses as well as a medication. It is one of the estrogens present in the estrogen mixtures known as conjugated estrogens (CEEs; brand name Premarin) and esterified estrogens (EEs; Estratab, Menest). CEEs is the most commonly used form of estrogen in hormone replacement therapy (HRT) for menopausal symptoms in the United States. Estrone sulfate is the major estrogen in CEEs (about 50%) while equilin sulfate is the second major estrogen in the formulation, present as about 25% of the total.

Pharmacology

Pharmacodynamics
Equilin is an estrogen, or an agonist of the estrogen receptors (ERs), the ERα and ERβ. In terms of relative binding affinity for the ERs, equilin has about 13% and 49% of that of estradiol for the ERα and ERβ, respectively. Analogously to the reversible transformation of estrone into estradiol by 17β-hydroxysteroid dehydrogenase, equilin can be converted into the more potent estrogen 17β-dihydroequilin in the body. This estrogen has about 113% and 108% of the relative binding affinities of estradiol for the ERα and ERβ, respectively. Equilin is present in CEEs in the form of equilin sulfate, which itself is inactive and acts as a prodrug of equilin via steroid sulfatase.

Similarly to synthetic estrogens like ethinylestradiol, equilin and CEEs have disproportionate effects in certain tissues such as the liver and uterus relative to bioidentical human estrogens like estradiol and estrone. Because of their disproportionate potency in the liver, equilin and CEEs have relatively increased effects on liver protein synthesis compared to estradiol.

A dosage of 0.25 mg/day equilin sulfate is equivalent to 0.625 mg/day CEEs in terms of relief from hot flashes. At a dosage of 0.625 mg/day equilin sulfate, the increases in circulating levels of sex hormone-binding globulin (SHBG), corticosteroid-binding globulin, and angiotensinogen were 1.5 to 8 times those observed with estrone sulfate. Equilin has about 42% of the relative potency of CEEs in the vagina and 80% of the relative potency of CEEs in the uterus, while its more active form, 17β-dihydroequilin, has about 83% of the relative potency of CEEs in the vagina and 200% of the relative potency of CEEs in the uterus.

Pharmacokinetics
Equilin has about 8% of the relative binding affinity of testosterone for SHBG, relative to 12% in the case of estrone. In terms of plasma protein binding, it is bound 26% to SHBG and 13% to albumin. The metabolic clearance rates of equilin and equilin sulfate are 2,640 L/day/m2 and 175 L/day/m2, respectively. In accordance, the biological half-life of equilin sulfate is substantially longer than that of equilin. Equilin is converted into 17β-dihydroequilin in the liver and in other tissues. Equilin and 17β-dihydroequilin can also be transformed into equilenin and 17β-dihydroequilenin. Equilin is excreted in the form of glucuronide conjugates.

Chemistry

Equilin, also known as δ7-estrone or as 7-dehydroestrone, as well as estra-1,3,5(10),7-tetraen-3-ol-17-one, is a naturally occurring estrane steroid and an analogue of estrone. In terms of chemical structure and pharmacology, equilin is to 17β-dihydroequilin (δ7-17β-estradiol) as estrone is to estradiol.

References

Sterols
Phenols
Estranes
Estrogens
Human drug metabolites
Ketones
Prodrugs